Lee Lynch may refer to:

 Lee Lynch (author), American author
 Lee Lynch (footballer), Irish football (soccer) player
 Lee Lynch (Illinois politician), American politician